The Women's artistic team all-around gymnastics competition at the 2014 Commonwealth Games in Glasgow, Scotland was held on 28 and 29 July at the Scottish Exhibition and Conference Centre.

The team competition also served as qualification for the individual all-around and event finals.

Team Competition

Qualification results

Individual all-around

Vault

Uneven bars

Balance beam

Floor exercise

References

Gymnastics at the 2014 Commonwealth Games
2014 in women's gymnastics